Kirk D. J. Ziola is a Canadian curler from London, Ontario.

Ziola is originally from Regina, Saskatchewan, and in 1983 won the provincial championship. His rink from Estevan, Saskatchewan represented the province at the 1983 Labatt Brier, where they finished with a 5-6 record.

Ziola moved to Ayr, Ontario in the 1980s. He played in the 1987 Canadian Olympic Curling Trials, skipping his rink to a 3-4 record.

References

External links
Player profile

Curlers from Ontario
Living people
Sportspeople from London, Ontario
Curlers from Regina, Saskatchewan
Year of birth missing (living people)